The Waterford–Mallow railway line ran from Waterford to  and allowed for trains to run directly from Waterford to Cork City.

History

The line was opened in stages by various companies and was completely opened on 12 August 1878.

The Waterford, Dungarvan and Lismore Railway (WD&LR) was incorporated in 1871 and fully opened its  section on 12 August 1878; thus completing the continuous connection from Cork via Mallow to Waterford. The WD&LR operated its own trains and was to take over operation of the Fermoy to Lismore section from the GS&WR on 1 March 1893.

The route was completely taken over by the GS&WR in 1898.    The route was closed in 1967

The line closed in March 1967 for economic reasons.  As most patronage was for Cork on the boat train it was possible to re-route between Waterford and Mallow via , a route that was of greater mileage but which only resulted in a maximum 10 minute increase in journey time.

Route

From Waterford to Dungarvan has some significant 1 in 66 inclines to two summits.
In 2022 a Greenway was proposed along the old route from Mallow to Dungarvan.

Services
The Fishguard & Rosslare Railways & Harbours Company gained authority to run a boat service from Fishguard, Wales to Rosslare Harbour in 1895.  The GS&WR were then able to run a service notably including a twelve-wheeled dining car from Rosslare routing via Waterford and Mallow at considerable convenience for travellers going to Cork City and further south-west.

References

Footnotes

Sources
 
 
 
 

Closed railways in Ireland